Johann or Hans Zimmermann may refer to:

Writers
Johann Jacob Zimmermann (1642–1693), German nonconformist theologian, mathematician and astronomer
Johann Georg Zimmermann (1728–1795), Swiss philosophical writer, naturalist and physician
Johann Heinrich Zimmermann (1741–1805), German oceanic explorer and chronicler

Public officials
Johann Christian Zimmermann (1786–1857), German businessman, diplomat and politician
Hans Zimmermann (1906–1984), German public official during Hitler era

Others
Johann Baptist Zimmermann (1680–1758), German Baroque painter
Hans Zimmermann (architect) (1831–1911), German chief of works

See also
Zimmermann